The 1974–75 European Cup was the tenth edition of the European Cup, IIHF's premier European club ice hockey tournament. The season started on September 1, 1974, and finished on February 19, 1977.

The tournament was won by Krylya Sovetov Moscow, who beat Dukla Jihlava in the final

First round
The first round was played September 1 – December 14, 1974.

 SC Bern,  
 Leksands IF  :  bye

Second round
The second round was played December 22, 1974 – February 6, 1975.

Third round
The third round was played in February 1975.

 Dukla Jihlava,  
 Krylya Sovetov Moscow :  bye

Semifinals
The semifinals were played September 1, 1975 – March 19, 1976.

Finals
The finals were played February 17–19, 1977.

References 
 Season 1974–75

1
IIHF European Cup